(May 11, 2005 - ) is a Japanese racehorse which won the 2008 Tokyo Yūshun and NHK Mile Cup.

Race career

2007 
In 2007, Deep Sky was two years old, and was left in the care of the trainer Kon. Deep Sky made his debut in October 2007, but was too young to race.

2008 
Deep Sky raced six times and finally won for the first time at the end of January 2008. Deep Sky also bested the horse Katsutoshi two races afterwards, but neither was able to win. However, Deep Sky won in Mainichi Hai at the end of March 2008, allowing entryin the NHK Mile Cup which is one of the big races for a three-year-old horse.

Deep Sky entered the NHK Mile Cup on schedule. Deep Sky ran through the inside, and by the last straight overtook Black Shell. Deep Sky was then entered in Tokyo Yūshun which was a race to select the strongest three-year-old horse in Japan.

In June 2008, Deep Sky won the prestigious Japanese Derby.

External links
 Deep Sky wins Japanese Derby

2005 racehorse births
Thoroughbred family 23-b
Racehorses bred in Japan
Racehorses trained in Japan